"Queen's Road East" is a song by Taiwanese singer-songwriter Lo Ta-yu, featuring Hong Kong singer Ram Chiang. It was released on 23 January 1991 as the title track of Lo's Cantonese-language compilation album of the same name. The song was composed by Lo and written by Hong Kong lyricist Albert Leung. It is named after Queen's Road East, a street in Hong Kong, and satirically expresses the anxiety felt by the city's residents over the impending handover of Hong Kong in 1997.

The song was banned in Mainland China twice, once upon its release in 1991 and a second time in 2019, during that year's protests in Hong Kong.

Background 

Queen's Road was the first road in Hong Kong, built between 1841 and 1843. Named after Queen Victoria, it became a local landmark and a symbol of British rule. The modern road is split into four sections: Queen's Road West, Queen's Road Central, Queensway, and Queen's Road East.

Lo Ta-yu left Taiwan in 1985 to practice medicine in the United States, before moving to Hong Kong two years later. In 1991, he established his own record label called Music Factory, with the Queen's Road East album as its first release. "Queen's Road East" was Lo's second song about Hong Kong after "Pearl of the Orient", which he composed in 1986.

Composition 
Lo was inspired to write "Queen's Road East" by the sight of road signs while out shopping. He first composed the melody and basic lyrics for the chorus, which mention Queen's Road West, Queen's Road East, and Queen's Road Central.  The lyrics were completed by Hong Kong lyricist Albert Leung, who was introduced to Lo by lyricist James Wong Jim. Leung's lyrics satirically express the anxiety felt by the city's residents over the impending handover of Hong Kong in 1997. In 1991, he spoke of a possibly "more restrictive creative environment" after the handover, which Leung said was why he "wrote [the song] now". He expressed his hope that "people will still remember it [after 1997] and make comparisons... To exaggerate a bit, [the song] will serve as a witness of history".

In a 1991 episode of the RTHK programme Hong Kong Connection, Lo and Leung discussed the song's musical composition and lyrics. Lo described the song's instrumental introduction as having a "mystical" quality that reflects the "vibrancy" he sees in Hong Kong. He also explained his personal interpretation of "Queen's Road": Queen' obviously is the Queen of the United Kingdom. 'Road' is one's way of life. The United Kingdom is the global pioneer of capitalism, so the 'Queen's Road' is actually capitalism." Lo thus characterises the song's chorus, "Queen's Road West and Queen's Road East/Queen's Road East turns into Queen's Road Central" as a reference to the journey of Hong Kong (East) from the United Kingdom (West) to China (Central), while bringing along the capitalist system (Queen's Road).

The song's lyrics mention both "the Queen" and "the Comrade". "The Queen" indirectly refers to the reigning British monarch at the time, Elizabeth II. The opening verse describes the Queen as a "noble friend on the back of coins" with "everlasting youth". One verse also describes her as "beautiful even when saying goodbye", a reference to the nightly television sign-offs in British Hong Kong featuring "God Save the Queen" and the Queen's portrait. On the other hand, "the Comrade" is called a "virtuous friend" who "looks familiar and friendly, thus allowing horse races to continue twice a week", referring to the Chinese authorities' promises to allow horse races involving gambling to continue in Hong Kong. One verse of the song laments that Hong Kong will "have to rely on great comrades to cook up new ideas". According to Leung and Lo, while the line implies the comrades are "other people", they intended it as a reference to the people of Hong Kong, as Leung believed that the term "comrade" (tongzhi in Chinese) would extend to them after the handover. Thus, Lo said the line was meant to encourage the people of Hong Kong to succeed into the future.

Release 
The Queen's Road East album was released on 23 January 1991, with "Queen's Road East" as its title track.

Later that year, Lo released an album in Taiwan titled Homeland, which included a Taiwanese Hokkien version of the song featuring Lim Giong, titled "Everyone is Not Shocked". This version was featured in the 1992 Taiwanese film Dust of Angels, with Lim and Lo performing the song in a cameo appearance.

Music videos 
One of the music videos for the "Queen's Road East" was produced by TVB. In the video, Lo and Chiang perform the song in Red Guard uniforms while uniformed young people imitate the poses of revolutionary statues and display red flags and banners. The video also shows cars and pedestrians moving in reverse, and the two singers imitating Chinese state leaders by walking along a street while clapping their hands. Researcher Sun Hongmei described the video as "shed[ding] all subtlety" compared to the song's lyrics, which "rel[y] on uncertainty, uneasiness, and subtle satire".

An alternate music video for the song presents it in a more subtle manner, alternating between Lo and imagery of Hong Kong.

Awards 
"Queen's Road East" received awards for Best Lyrics and Best Composition at the 1991 Jade Solid Gold Best Ten Music Awards Presentation.

Censorship 
Due to its politically sensitive lyrics, "Queen's Road East" was banned in Mainland China upon its release in 1991, before being unbanned in 2000. During the Hong Kong protests in 2019, lyrics from the song were used by Mainland Chinese internet users to circumvent censorship on the topic and express support for the protests. According to Quartz, some comments may have been referring to the occupation of Queensway during the protests on 12 June 2019.  "Queen's Road East" was removed from major Chinese music streaming platforms in June 2019, with some reports stating the song was banned due to its lyrics and association with the Hong Kong protests. Later that year, over 3000 songs written by Leung were reportedly taken off Chinese music streaming platforms after he voiced support for the protests in Hong Kong.

Also in 2019, the Sing Tao Daily reported that a karaoke operator in the Chinese city of Beihai was investigated and fined for playing a music video of "Queen's Road East", which features a scene with the portraits of Chinese state leaders repeated across the screen accompanied with the song's lyrics. The reported cited an Administrative Penalty Decision by the local police, which characterised "Queen's Road East" as a "prohibited song" and stated that the scene "mocked" state leaders.

Legacy 
Lyrics from "Queen's Road East" were shared by Hong Kong internet users in remembrance of Queen Elizabeth II following her death in September 2022.

Notes

References 

Cantonese-language songs
1991 songs
Hong Kong songs
Songs about streets
Political songs
Songs about Hong Kong
Songs about queens
Censorship of music